Star Light, Star Bright is the name of a 1976 collection of science fiction short stories by American writer Alfred Bester, first published in 1976.

Contents

 "Adam and No Eve"
 "Time Is the Traitor"
 "Oddie And Id"
 "Hobson's Choice"
 "Star Light, Star Bright"
 "They Don't Make Life Like They Used To"
 "Of Time and Third Avenue"
 "The Pi Man"
 "Something Up There Likes Me"

External links
 "Star Light, Star Bright"

1976 short story collections
Short story collections by Alfred Bester